The Sundale Bridge is a bridge located in the Gold Coast region of South East, Queensland, Australia. Officially known as the Gold Coast Bridge, but locally referred to as the Sundale Bridge due to its proximity to the site of the former Sundale Shopping Centre, the bridge spans the Nerang River linking the suburbs of Southport and Main Beach. Opened initially in 1966, the bridge replaced the Jubilee Bridge, and comprises four separate decks and pier structures built at various stages and for a variety of purposes.

Features

The dual carriageway comprising two mirrored sets of eleven concrete piers together with a concrete deck each that carries vehicular traffic was opened in 1966. The decks carried what was then known as the Pacific Highway and is now known as the Gold Coast Highway. In addition to vehicular traffic, a narrow pedestrian footpath formed part of the dual deck structure. In 2010 a separate set of eleven concrete piers were sited upriver adjacent to the most westerly of the existing two decks. A concrete deck completed the bridge structure and carries the Gold Coast Light Rail line that was officially opened in February 2014. A fourth structure was completed comprising twelve concrete piers that were sited downriver adjacent to the most easterly of the original two decks. A concrete deck completed the bridge structure and carries pedestrians and cyclists as a footbridge, opened in June 2014.

See also

Nerang River Crossings
List of bridges

References

External links

Bridges in Queensland
Buildings and structures on the Gold Coast, Queensland
Main Beach, Queensland
Southport, Queensland
1966 establishments in Australia
2014 establishments in Australia